Several vessels have been named for the Roman deity Mercury:

  was launched on the Thames. In 1791 she made the first of two voyages as a whaler to Delagoa Bay. She was reported in February 1794 to have been lost off Mozambique while on her second voyage to the region.
  apparently was launched in 1786 at Topsham, but her career prior to 1790 is obscure. She initially traded with Virginia and then with the "Straits". In 1794-1795 she made one voyage for the British East India Company (EIC). On her return she became a West Indiaman. She was lost in 1802.
  was launched at Liverpool. She made 10 voyages as a slave ship before a privateer captured her on her 11th voyage.
 
  was launched at Calcutta. She may have made one voyage for the EIC in 1806–1807. She was also one of the vessels in Stamford Raffles's expedition in 1819 to occupy Singapore. She was sold in 1822.
  (formerly MV Mercury, Celebrity Mercury and Mein Schiff 2) was launched in 1797.

See also
  – any one of 17 vessels or shore establishments of that name
  was a 14-gun brig launched at Bombay Dockyard in 1806 for the naval arm of the British East India Company and lost at sea in 1833.
  
  – any one of seven vessels of that name

Citations

Ship names
Royal Navy ship names